Michael David Wilson (born 25 November 1980) is a New Zealand retired soccer midfielder who most recently played for the Ecuadorian club Aucas. Wilson played college soccer at Stanford University and represented New Zealand at the international level.

International career
Wilson played for New Zealand U-17 at the 1997 FIFA U-17 World Championship in Egypt, appearing in 2 matches at the finals.

In 2000, Wilson moved to the United States, where he played college soccer for Stanford.  Nicknamed, "Sydney," the New Zealander played on teams that won a Pac-10 championship (2001), as well as making two college cups. After graduating, Wilson was selected in the 2004 MLS SuperDraft by the San Jose Earthquakes.

He made his full All Whites debut as a substitute in a 0-3 loss to Iran on 12 October 2003 and made a total of seven A-international appearances, his final cap an appearance in a 1-1 draw with Estonia on 31 May 2006.

Although he was included in the New Zealand side for the 2003 Confederations Cup finals tournament in France, Wilson did not make an appearance at the tournament.

References

External links 

Wilson's FEF player card 
Mike Wilson profile at NZ Football

1980 births
Living people
New Zealand association footballers
Stanford Cardinal men's soccer players
USL First Division players
Minnesota Thunder players
New Zealand international footballers
Expatriate footballers in Ecuador
Expatriate soccer players in the United States
New Zealand expatriate sportspeople in Ecuador
New Zealand expatriate sportspeople in the United States
2003 FIFA Confederations Cup players
2004 OFC Nations Cup players
S.D. Aucas footballers
A-League (1995–2004) players
San Jose Earthquakes draft picks
Association football defenders